Stella ( - literally, the star) is a comune of the Province of Savona in the Italian region Liguria. It borders the comuni of Albisola Superiore, Celle Ligure, Pontinvrea, Sassello and Varazze.

Frazioni 

The commune is divided into five distinct localities, or frazioni, known locally as the cinque stelle, or ‘five stars’.

Stella San Giovanni, some ten minutes by car from the sea and adjacent to Albisola, is the site of the town hall. Sandro Pertini, seventh President of the Italian Republic was born here and is buried in its cemetery.

Stella San Giustina, five minutes by car to the north of San Giovanni and about 15 from the sea, is located in an area rich in woodland. Its original name was Danaveta and in the Middle Ages it was a possession of the Abbey of Santa Giustina, Sezzadio. A landmark is the eighteenth-century chimney which belonged to a tannery which was destroyed by a flood in the 1920s.

Stella San Martino, thought to be the earliest of the settlements, stands on a hill to the east of San Giovanni. The houses and the parish church bear characteristic sundials.

Stella San Bernardo is the most westerly part of Stella. The surrounding wooded mountains, rich in streams, and the panoramic views which it affords, make it popular centre for holiday makers.

Stella Gameragna is the southernmost of the frazioni and the closest to the sea. Its historic centre is characterised by narrow lanes.

Demographic evolution

References

External links

 www.comune.stella.sv.it/

Cities and towns in Liguria